Sharif Aydarus Sharif Ali Al-Nadheeri or short Sharif Aydarus was a famous scholar of Islamic and Somali history and  pan-Islamic leader.

History 
He was born in the city of Mogadishu in the year 1311 A.H. (1893) and belonged to the coastal Reer Hamar confederation and the Asharaf clan from the Shingani district. Grew up to become of the most renown Somali scholars and historians.

He studied the Qur'an in the coastal cities of Mombasa and Lamu, eventually to return to Mogadishu his hometown to teach the locals and preach at the famous Shingani Mosque.

He used to collect Somali history and teach it in his lectures, eventually all his work and manuscript's were assembled and published in the year 1950 in arabic by the Trusteeship Administration as Bughyat al-Aamaal fi Taarikh al-Sumaal, (The history of Somalia ).

Sharif Aydarus founded the pan Islamic Somali party called  al-Raabitah al-Islamiyyah. He worked with multiple leaders and individuals of the tariqa order to spread the Islamic faith in East Africa. He also served as head of the Mogadishu branch of the Pan-Islamic Party called al-Mu’tamar al-Islami (Organization of Islamic Conference) until he died in the 1960s.

References 

1893 births
1960 deaths
Historians of Islam